The Peggy V. Helmerich Distinguished Author Award is an American literary prize awarded by the Tulsa Library Trust in Tulsa, Oklahoma.  It is awarded annually to an "internationally acclaimed" author who has "written a distinguished body of work and made a major contribution to the field of literature and letters".

History of the award
First given in 1985, with a cash prize of $5,000, by 2006 the prize had increased to $40,000 cash and an engraved crystal book. To date, all of the recipients have been English-language writers.

The award is named after Peggy V. Helmerich, a prominent Tulsa library activist, philanthropist and the wife of Tulsa oilman Walter Helmerich III.  Before her marriage, under the stage name Peggy Dow, she had been a motion picture actress, best known for playing the role of Nurse Kelly in the 1950 James Stewart film vehicle, Harvey and for co-starring with Best Actor Oscar nominee Arthur Kennedy in 1951's Bright Victory.

The first honoree was writer and longtime Saturday Review of Literature editor Norman Cousins, with the evening's theme announced as "The Salutary Aspects of Laughter". In 1997, distinguished African-American historian John Hope Franklin became the first (and so far only) native Oklahoman to receive the award.  While in Tulsa to accept the award, Franklin made several appearances to speak about his childhood experiences with racial segregation as well as his father's experiences as a lawyer in the aftermath of the 1921 Tulsa race riot.

In 2004, 88-year-old Arthur Miller was initially announced as the honoree, but subsequently declined the award when illness prevented him from attending the December award ceremony and dinner; he died two months later.  David McCullough, the 1995 winner, replaced him as featured speaker at the dinner and, later, returned his honorarium to the library.

The following year's initial choice to be the honoree was again unable to accept due to illness: Oklahoman Tony Hillerman, who would have been the state's second native son to receive the award was, ultimately, replaced by John Grisham. Library Journal reported that Grisham donated the monetary prize to his Hurricane Katrina relief fund, and also used the occasion to research details for The Innocent Man: Murder and Injustice in a Small Town, his non-fiction account of an Oklahoma inmate cleared of murder charges shortly before his execution date.  Reporting on Grisham's selection as Hillerman's replacement, a Virginia newspaper called the Helmerich Award the "best literary award you've never heard of."

The 2017 honoree is novelist Richard Ford.

List of winners
The following authors have received the award since 1985:

1985   Norman Cousins
1986   Larry McMurtry
1987   John Updike
1988   Toni Morrison
1989   Saul Bellow
1990   John le Carré
1991   Eudora Welty
1992   Norman Mailer
1993   Peter Matthiessen
1994   Ray Bradbury
1995   David McCullough
1996   Neil Simon
1997   John Hope Franklin
1998   E. L. Doctorow
1999   Margaret Atwood
2000   William Manchester
2001   William Kennedy
2002   Joyce Carol Oates
2003   Shelby Foote
2004   David McCullough
2005   John Grisham
2006   Mark Helprin
2007   Thomas Keneally
2008   Michael Chabon
2009   Geraldine Brooks
2010   Ian McEwan
2011   Alan Furst
2012   Wendell Berry
2013   Kazuo Ishiguro 
2014    Ann Patchett
2015     Rick Atkinson
2016     Billy Collins
2017     Richard Ford
2018     Hilary Mantel
2019     Stacy Schiff
2020     Marilynne Robinson
2022     Elizabeth Strout

See also
Tulsa City-County Library

References

External links
Peggy V. Helmerich Distinguished Author Award official website
Tulsa Library Trust official website
Peggy Dow at Internet Movie Database.
 Voices of Oklahoma interview with Peggy Helmerich. First person interview conducted with Peggy Helmerich on October 9, 2009. Original audio and transcript archived with Voices of Oklahoma oral history project.

American literary awards
Awards established in 1985
Literary awards honoring writers
Culture of Tulsa, Oklahoma
1985 establishments in Oklahoma